The Pirate's Dream is a 1940 Italian film directed by Mario Mattoli and starring Erminio Macario.

Plot
The setting is Santa Cruz, in the second half of the eighteenth century. The Governor of the island, to ingratiate himself with the Viceroy, contrives to have the island assaulted from a mock pirate ship. The plan is to have a mock battle, defeat the aggressors and throw them back into the sea. The trouble is that the pirates really come...

Cast
 Erminio Macario as José
 Juan de Landa as Bieco de la Muerte
 Enzo Biliotti as Il governatore
 Dora Bini as Olivia
 Mario Siletti as Il viceré
 Carmen Navasqués as La viceregina (as Carmen Navascues)
 Agnese Dubbini as La nutrice
 Katiuscia Odinzova as Lupita
 Carlo Rizzo as Pedro
 Tino Scotti as Il barbiere

References

External links

1940 films
1940 comedy films
1940s Italian-language films
Italian black-and-white films
Films directed by Mario Mattoli
Italian historical comedy films
Seafaring films
Films set in the 18th century
Pirate films
1940s Italian films